Jante  was a village development committee in Morang District in the Kosi Zone of south-eastern Nepal.Now It is Letang Municipality ward no.9 At the time of the 1991 Nepal census it had a population of 5622 people living in 1010 individual households. It contains various communities like Limbu, Rai, Brahmin, Chettri, Magar and Newar.It contains many temples and church. This village development committee is connected by the Jante-Pathari and Jante-Letang highways.

Religious fare
Jante is known for its high-spirited festival celebrations. In Dashain, Nepal's biggest festival, large number of people celebrate with joy. Also famous is Tihar, festival of lights, when the residents line their homes with diyo (an earthen oil lamp), candles and decorative electrical lamps during the two days of celebration. Fire crackers are banned in Nepal and are strictly prohibited to use during Tihar but smuggling it during Tihar is very popular. Krishna Astami (birthday of Krishna) is a festival that is heavily celebrated in Jante. hundreds of people gather on that day to celebrate krishna janmaastami on the radhakrishna mandir which is located on jante 9.

Education
The teaching medium of education is English in all the private schools, whereas Nepali is the medium of instruction in government schools up to secondary level. There is also one Christian primary boarding school run by the Christian community.

References

Letang Municipality
Miklajung, Morang
Village development committees in Morang District